Appy Fizz is a product by Parle Agro, introduced in India in 2005. Appy Fizz consists of carbonated apple juice, and can be used as the basis for cocktails. It does not contain alcohol. 

Appy Fizz is also manufactured and marketed in Bangladesh by Global Beverage Co Ltd. under licence from Parle Agro.

In 2018, Parle Agro stated that the Appy Fizz brand was worth ₹650 crore ($97.5 million), and planned to push it to over ₹1,000 crore ($150 million).

Related products

After the success of Appy which was clean apple juice, Parle launched its sequel product as Grappo Fizz, which is a carbonated grape juice. The drink was the subject of a failed campaign of advertising at cricket matches in 2005–08.

B-Fizz was launched in 2020 as a malt-flavored fruit drink.

References

Indian drink brands